Claudio Muñoz may refer to:

 Claudio Muñoz (footballer, born 1981), Chilean football centre-back and right-back
 Claudio Muñoz (footballer, born 1984), Chilean football defender